A Symphony of Color (2008) is a mosaic by artist Donna Pinter of Roswell, Georgia. It is located in the Virginia Highland neighborhood of Atlanta, along Barnett Street north of Drewry Street.

References
 Architecture Tourist (pictures and video)
 Mosaics by Donna Pinter
 Panoramic photo of the entire length of the mosaic

Mosaics
2008 sculptures
Virginia-Highland
Outdoor sculptures in Georgia (U.S. state)